The Sony E 18-50mm F4-5.6 is a variable maximum aperture standard zoom lens for the Sony E-mount, announced by Sony in March 2014. The lens was bundled with the  Sony α3500 and sold exclusively in Australia, Mexico, Russia, Eastern Europe, the Middle East, and Africa.

The lens was discontinued by Sony in late 2016.

Build quality
The lens features a plastic exterior over plastic internals and a rubber focus ring, similar to that of the Sony FE 50mm F1.8 lens. It showcases recessed front lens element, focusing ring, and a matte black finish. The lens does not feature image stabilization.

See also
List of Sony E-mount lenses
Sony E 18-55mm F3.5-5.6 OSS

References

Camera lenses introduced in 2014
18-50